Sean Reilly may refer to:

Sean Reilly (soccer) (born 1991), American soccer player
Sean Reilly (The Last Templar)
Sean Reilly, character in Connor: Spotlight

See also
Shawn Reilly (disambiguation)
Sean Riley (disambiguation)